The ICC Men's T20 World Cup (earlier known as ICC World Twenty20) is the international championship of Twenty20. Organised by cricket's governing body, the International Cricket Council (ICC), the tournament consists of 20 teams, with top 12 teams from the previous tournament getting automatic qualifications. while the 8 other teams chosen through the Regional Qualifiers

The event has generally been held every two years. In May 2016, the ICC put forward the idea of having a tournament in 2018, with South Africa being the possible host, but the ICC later dropped the idea of a 2018 edition at the conclusion of the 2017 ICC Champions Trophy. The 2020 edition of the tournament was scheduled to take place in 2020 in Australia but due to the COVID-19 pandemic, the tournament was postponed until 2021, with the intended host changed to India. The tournament was later relocated to the United Arab Emirates (UAE) and Oman due to problems relating to the COVID-19 pandemic in India, taking place 5 years after the previous (2016) iteration.

As of 2022, eight tournaments have so far been played and a total of 21 teams have competed. Only the West Indies and  England have won the tournament on multiple occasions, both having won two titles. The inaugural 2007 World Twenty20, was staged in South Africa, and won by India, who defeated Pakistan in the final at the Wanderers Stadium in Johannesburg. The 2009 tournament took place in England, and was won by the previous runner-up, Pakistan, who defeated Sri Lanka in the final at Lord's. The third tournament was held in 2010, hosted by the countries making up the West Indies cricket team. England defeated Australia in the final in Barbados, which was played at Kensington Oval, winning their first international tournament. The fourth tournament, the 2012 World Twenty20, was held in Asia for the first time, with all matches played in Sri Lanka. The West Indies won the tournament by defeating Sri Lanka in the final, winning its first international tournament since the 2004 Champions Trophy. The fifth tournament, the 2014 ICC World Twenty20, was hosted by Bangladesh, and was won by Sri Lanka defeating India, Sri Lanka being the first team to play in three finals. The sixth tournament, the 2016 ICC World Twenty20, was hosted by India and was won by West Indies defeating England. The seventh tournament, the 2021 ICC Men's T20 World Cup , was hosted by UAE and was won by Australia defeating New Zealand.

England are the reigning T20 World Cup holders, having beaten Pakistan in the 2022 final, winning their second title. They became the first men's team to hold both limited-overs World Cups (T20 and ODI) simultaneously.

History

Background
When the Benson & Hedges Cup ended in 2002, the ECB needed another one-day competition to fill with the younger generation in response to dwindling crowds and reduced sponsorship. The Board wanted to deliver fast-paced, exciting cricket accessible to thousands of fans who were put off by the longer versions of the game. Stuart Robertson, the marketing manager of the ECB, proposed a 20-over per innings game to county chairmen in 2001, and they voted 11–7 in favour of adopting the new format.

Domestic tournaments

The first official Twenty20 matches were played on 13 June 2003 between the English counties in the Twenty20 Cup. The first season of Twenty20 in England was a relative success, with the Surrey Lions defeating the Warwickshire Bears by 9 wickets in the final to claim the title. The first Twenty20 match held at Lord's, on 15 July 2004 between Middlesex and Surrey, attracted a crowd of 27,509, the largest attendance for any county cricket game at the ground - other than a one-day final - since 1953.

Soon after with the adoption of Twenty20 matches by other cricket boards, the popularity of the format grew with unexpected crowd attendance, new domestic tournaments such as Pakistan's Faysal Bank T20 Cup and Stanford 20/20 tournament, and the financial incentive in the format.

The West Indies regional teams competed in what was named the Stanford 20/20 tournament. Convicted fraudster Allen Stanford backed the event financially, giving at least US$28,000,000 funding money, the fruit of his massive Ponzi scheme. It was intended that the tournament would be an annual event. Guyana won the inaugural event, defeating Trinidad and Tobago by 5 wickets and securing US$1,000,000 in prize money. A spin-off tournament, the Stanford Super Series, took place in October 2008 between Middlesex and Trinidad and Tobago, the respective winners of the English and Caribbean Twenty20 competitions, and a Stanford Superstars team formed from West Indies domestic players; Trinidad and Tobago won the competition, securing US$280,000 prize money. On 1 November, the Stanford Superstars played England in what was expected to be the first of five fixtures in as many years with the winner claiming a US$20,000,000 in each match.

Twenty20 Internationals

On 17 February 2005 Australia defeated New Zealand in the first men's full international Twenty20 match, played at Eden Park in Auckland. The game was played in a light-hearted manner – both sides turned out in kit similar to that worn in the 1980s, the New Zealand team's a direct copy of that worn by the Beige Brigade. Some of the players also sported moustaches/beards and hair-styles popular in the 1980s, taking part in a competition amongst themselves for "best retro look", at the request of the Beige Brigade. Australia won the game comprehensively, and as the result became obvious towards the end of the NZ innings, the players and umpires took things less seriously – Glenn McGrath jokingly replayed the Trevor Chappell underarm incident from a 1981 ODI between the two sides, and Billy Bowden showed him a mock red card (red cards are not normally used in cricket) in response.

Inaugural tournaments

It was first decided that every two years an ICC World Twenty20 tournament is to take place, except in the event of a Cricket World Cup being scheduled in the same year, in which case it will be held the year before. The first tournament was in 2007 in South Africa where India defeated Pakistan in the final. Kenya and Scotland had to qualify via the 2007 ICC World Cricket League Division One which was a 50-over competition that took place in Nairobi. In December 2007 it was decided to hold a qualifying tournament with a 20-over format to better prepare the teams. With six participants, two would qualify for the 2009 World Twenty20 and would each receive $250,000 in prize money. The second tournament was won by Pakistan who beat Sri Lanka by 8 wickets in England on 21 June 2009. The 2010 ICC World Twenty20 tournament was held in West Indies in May 2010, where England defeated Australia by 7 wickets. The 2012 ICC World Twenty20 was won by the West-Indies, by defeating Sri Lanka at the finals. For the first time, a host nation competed in the final of the ICC World Twenty20. There were 12 participants for the title including Ireland and Afghanistan as 2012 ICC World Twenty20 Qualifier. It was the first time the T20 World Cup tournament took place in an Asian country.

Expansion to 16 teams
The 2012 edition was to be expanded into a 16 team format however this was reverted to 12. The 2014 tournament, held in Bangladesh was the first to feature 16 teams including all ten full members and six associate members who qualified through the 2013 ICC World Twenty20 Qualifier. However the top eight full member teams in the ICC Men's T20I Team rankings on 8 October 2012 were given a place in the Super 10 stage. The remaining eight teams competed in the group stage, from which two teams advance to the Super 10 stage. Three new teams (Nepal, Hong Kong and the UAE) made their debut in this tournament.

COVID-19

In July 2020, the ICC announced that 2021 edition has been postponed by two year due to the pandemic. Therefore, the 2020 tournament (originally to be hosted by Australia) was moved to November 2022, and the 2021 tournament was originally to be hosted by India, due to Pandemic the matches was played in Oman and the United Arab Emirates.  Both retained the rights to host the tournaments, with India hosting in 2021 and Australia in 2022. The 2021 tournament ran from 17 October to 14 November 2021, The 2022 tournament ran from 16 October to 13 November 2022.

Expansion to 20 teams
In June 2021, the ICC announced that the T20 World Cup tournaments in 2024, 2026, 2028, and 2030 will be expanded to include 20 teams. The teams will be divided into 4 groups (5 per group), with the top two teams from each group advancing to the Super Eights. They will be divided into two groups of four, with the top two from each group advancing to the semi-finals.

The 2024 T20 World Cup will be hosted by the West Indies and the United States. It will be the first time the US has hosted a World Cup, with multiple stadiums across the country either being newly built or repurposed for cricket. The 2026 tournament will be co-hosted by India and Sri Lanka, with the 2028 edition in Australia and New Zealand, as well as the 2030 tournament in England, Wales, Scotland and Ireland following.

Format

Hosts
The International Cricket Council's executive committee votes for the hosts of the tournament after examining bids from the nations which have expressed an interest in holding the event. After South Africa in 2007, the tournament was hosted by England, the West Indies and Sri Lanka in 2009, 2010 and 2012 respectively. Bangladesh hosted the tournament in 2014. India hosted the tournament in 2016. After a gap of five years, India won the hosting rights of 2021 edition as well, but due to COVID-19 pandemic the matches were played in Oman and the United Arab Emirates. The 2022 edition was hosted by Australia, who won the tournament in the previous year.

In December 2015, Tim Anderson, the ICC's head of global development, suggested that a future tournament be hosted by the United States. He believed that hosting the event could help spur growth of the game in the country, where it is relatively obscure and faces competition by other sports such as baseball. In 2020, the United States and West Indies expressed interest in co-hosting a T20 World Cup after 2023, with Malaysia being another possible contender. In November 2021, the ICC confirmed the hosts for the next four Men's T20 World Cup tournaments from 2024 to 2030. The United States and West Indies would co-host the 2024 edition, India and Sri Lanka to co-host the 2026 edition, Australia and New Zealand to co-host the 2028 edition and the 2030 edition is to be co-hosted by United Kingdom and Ireland.

Qualification

All ICC full members qualify automatically for the tournament, with the remaining places filled by other ICC members through a qualification tournament, known as the T20 World Cup Qualifier. Qualification for the inaugural 2007 World Twenty20 came from the results of the first cycle of the World Cricket League, a 50-over league for ICC associate and affiliate members. The two finalists of the 2007 WCL Division One tournament, Kenya and Scotland, qualified for the World Twenty20 later in the year. A separate qualification tournament was implemented for the 2009 World Twenty20, and has been retained since then. The number of teams qualifying through the World Twenty20 Qualifier has varied, however, ranging from two (in 2010 and 2012) to six (in 2014 and 2016).

Final tournament
In each group stage (both the preliminary round and the Super 12 round), teams are ranked against each other based on the following criteria:
 Higher number of points
 If equal, higher number of wins
 If still equal, higher net run rate
 If still equal, lower bowling strike rate
 If still equal, result of head-to-head meeting.

In case of a tie (that is, both teams scoring the same number of runs at the end of their respective innings), a Super Over would decide the winner. In the case of a tie occurring again in the Super Over, subsequent super overs would be played until there is a winner. Earlier, the match would be won by the team that had scored the most boundaries in their innings. During the 2007 tournament, a bowl-out was used to decide the loser of tied matches.

Trophy
The ICC Men's T20 World Cup trophy is presented to the winners of the final. It was designed and manufactured by Links of London, and is made of silver and rhodium.

Results

Team performance
Correct as of final of the 2022 ICC Men's T20 World Cup.
Teams are ordered by best result then by winning percentage, then alphabetically:

Note:
 The number in bracket indicates number of wins in the tied matches (using methods of bowl-out, Super Over).

Team results by tournament

Legend
  – Champions
  – Runners-up
  – Semi-finalist
  – Round 2 (Super 8s, Super 10s and Super 12s)
 R1 – Round 1 (group stage)
 Q – Qualified, Still in Competition
 × – Qualified but withdrew
 ×× – Ineligible for qualification (suspended)

Tournament records

By tournament

See also

 List of Twenty20 International records
Cricket World Cup
ICC Women's T20 World Cup
ICC Champions Trophy

References

External links

Official Twenty20 ICC World Cup website
Official T20 ICC World Cup website

 
World championships in cricket
Twenty20
Twenty20 International cricket competitions
Recurring sporting events established in 2007